Racinoa versicolora is a moth in the family Bombycidae. It was described by Lars Kühne in 2008. It is found in Kenya.

References

Endemic moths of Kenya
Bombycidae
Moths described in 2008